Icaridin, also known as picaridin, is an insect repellent which can be used directly on skin or clothing. It has broad efficacy against various arthropods such as mosquitos, ticks, gnats, flies and fleas, and is almost colorless and odorless. A study performed in 2010 showed that picaridin spray and cream at the 20% concentration provided 12 hours of protection against ticks. Icaridin does not dissolve plastics, synthetics or sealants.

The name picaridin was proposed as an International Nonproprietary Name (INN) to the World Health Organization (WHO), but the official name that has been approved by the WHO is icaridin. The chemical is part of the piperidine family, along with many pharmaceuticals and alkaloids such as piperine, which gives black pepper its spicy taste.

Trade names include Bayrepel and Saltidin among others. The compound was developed by the German chemical company Bayer and was given the name Bayrepel. In 2005, Lanxess AG and its subsidiary Saltigo GmbH were spun off from Bayer and the product was renamed Saltidin in 2008.

On 23 July 2020, icaridin was approved again by the EU Commission for use in repellent products. The approval entered into force on 1 February 2022 and is valid for ten years.

Effectiveness 

Icaridin has been reported to be as effective as DEET without the irritation associated with DEET. According to the WHO, icaridin “demonstrates excellent repellent properties comparable to, and often superior to, those of the standard DEET.” In the United States, the Centers for Disease Control and Prevention recommends using repellents based on icaridin, DEET, ethyl butylacetylaminopropionate (IR3535), or oil of lemon eucalyptus (containing p-menthane-3,8-diol, PMD) for effective protection against mosquitoes that carry the West Nile virus, eastern equine encephalitis and other illnesses.

Icaridin-based products, first used in Europe in 2001, have been evaluated by Consumer Reports in 2016 as among the most effective insect repellents when used at a 20% concentration. Icaridin was earlier reported to be effective by Consumer Reports (7% solution) and the Australian Army (20% solution). Consumer Reports retests in 2006 gave as result that a 7% solution of icaridin offered little or no protection against Aedes mosquitoes (vector of dengue fever) and a protection time of about 2.5 hours against Culex (vector of West Nile virus), while a 15% solution was good for about one hour against Aedes and 4.8 hours against Culex.

Larval salamander toxicity 

A 2018 study found that a commercial repellent product containing 20% icaridin, in what the authors described as "conservative exposure doses", is highly toxic to salamander larvae.

Since only the icaridin content of the tested repellent product is known, the observed effects cannot be readily attributed to icaridin. Furthermore, the effects of the repellent product showed no dose-response relationship, i.e., there was neither an increase of the magnitude or severity of the observed effects (mortality, tail deformation), nor did the effects occur at earlier time points. The study has been regarded as invalid by the Danish Environmental Protection Agency, which has evaluated icaridin prior to its approval under the EU Biocidal Product Regulation. The reasons for rejection were the testing of a mixture of undisclosed composition, the use of a non-standard test organism, the lack of analytical verification of actual test concentrations, and the fact that the test solution was never renewed with the 25 days of study duration.

The study observed high larval salamander mortality occurring delayed after the four days of exposure. Because the widely used LC50 test for assessing a chemical's environmental toxicity is based on mortality within four days, the authors suggested that icaridin would be incorrectly deemed as "safe" under the test protocol. However, icaridin was also non-toxic in a 21-day reproduction test on the water flea Daphnia magna and a 32-day early life-stage test in zebrafish.

Chemistry 

Icaridin contains two stereocenters: one where the hydroxyethyl chain attaches to the ring, and one where the sec-butyl attaches to the oxygen of the carbamate. The commercial material contains a mixture of all four stereoisomers.

Commercial products
Commercial products containing icaridin include Cutter Advanced, Muskol, Skin So Soft Bug Guard Plus, Off! FamilyCare, Autan, Smidge, PiActive and MOK.O.

Mechanism
A potential odorant receptor for icaridin (and DEET), the CquiOR136•CquiOrco, has been suggested recently for Culex quinquefasciatus mosquito.

Recent crystal and solution studies showed that icaridin binds to Anopheles gambiae odorant binding protein 1 (AgamOBP1).  The crystal structure of AgamOBP1•icaridin complex (PDB: 5EL2) revealed that icaridin binds to the DEET-binding site in two distinct orientations and also to a second binding site (sIC-binding site) located at the C-terminal region of the AgamOBP1.

Recent evidence with Anopheles gambiae mosquitoes suggests icaridin does not strongly activate olfactory receptors neurons, but instead functions to reduce the volatility of the odorants to which it is mixed. By reducing odor volatility, icaridin functions to "mask" the ability of volatile odorants on the skin to activate olfactory neurons and attract mosquitoes.

See also 
 SS220, another substituted-piperidine insect repellent

References

External links 
 Picaridin General Fact Sheet - National Pesticide Information Center
 Choosing and Using Insect Repellents - National Pesticide Information Center
 EPA fact sheet

Household chemicals
Insect repellents
Carbamates
Piperidines
Primary alcohols